The 2021–22 Portland State Vikings men's basketball team represented Portland State University in the 2021–22 NCAA Division I men's basketball season. The Vikings, led by first-year head coach Jase Coburn, played their home games at Viking Pavilion in Portland, Oregon as members of the Big Sky Conference.

Previous season
The Vikings finished the 2020–21 season 9–13, 6–8 in Big Sky play to finish in a tie for seventh place. They lost to Northern Arizona in the first round of the Big Sky tournament.

On April 6, 2021, head coach Barret Peery left the team to take the associate head coaching position at Texas Tech. On April 16, after being named interim head coach following Peery's departure, associate head coach Jase Coburn was named the permanent head coach.

Roster

Schedule and results

|-
!colspan=12 style=| Regular season

|-
!colspan=9 style=| Big Sky tournament

Source

References

Portland State Vikings men's basketball seasons
Portland State Vikings
Portland State Vikings men's basketball
Portland State Vikings men's basketball